Calabrese Montenuovo is an ancient variety of red wine grape from Italy. It was discovered in a vineyard in Campania and became famous when it was found to be one of the parents of Sangiovese.

History
Little is known about Calabrese Montenuovo, but the link to Sangiovese has prompted considerable research. It is believed to have originated in Calabria, hence the name.

Wine regions
Calabrese Montenuovo was found in a vineyard in Campania, but similar grapes have since been found at several sites further south, in Calabria.

Viticulture
The grapes are red.

Synonyms
Calabrese di Montenuovo. It should not be confused with other grapes that bear the Calabrese name, such as Nero d'Avola.

See also
Sangiovese
Ciliegiolo

References

Further reading
 Vouillamoz et al., The parentage of 'Sangiovese', the most important Italian wine grape, Vitis Germany 2007, 46 (1) 19-22, 

Red wine grape varieties
Wine grapes of Italy
Wine grapes of Apulia